Roland J. Ortmayer (August 22, 1917 – October 8, 2008) was an American football player and coach. He served as the head football coach at William Penn University in Oskaloosa, Iowa from 1946 to 1947 and the University of La Verne in La Verne, California from 1948 to 1990. Ortmayer was noted for his unorthodox approach to the sport of football. He held non-mandatory practices and did not require offseason weight training for his players. When he retired, his career record of 182–209–8 gave him the most loses of any college football coach in history. His record for career losses was surpassed by Watson Brown, who retired with 211 losses in 2015.

Ortmayer taught and coached at Highland Park High School in Highland Park, Illinois before he was hired, in 1941, as an assistant coach at Dobyns-Bennett High School in Kingsport, Tennessee.

Head coaching record

College football

See also
 List of college football coaches with 100 losses

Notes

References

1917 births
2008 deaths
American football halfbacks
La Verne Leopards football coaches
Northwestern Wildcats football players
William Penn Statesmen baseball coaches
William Penn Statesmen football coaches
William Penn Statesmen men's basketball coaches
High school football coaches in Illinois
High school football coaches in Tennessee